Arthur Wesley Carr KCVO (26 July 1941 – 15 July 2017) was an Anglican priest who was the Dean of Westminster from 1997 to 2006.

Early life
Carr was educated at Dulwich College and then at Jesus College, Oxford. After theological studies at Ridley Hall, Cambridge, he was ordained a deacon in 1967 and a priest in 1968.

Ministry
Carr's first appointment was as a curate at St Mary's Church, Luton (Diocese of St Albans) from 1967 to 1971. He was then a tutor (1970–1971) and a chaplain (1971–1972) at Ridley Hall, Cambridge. While at the University of Sheffield he was an honorary curate at Ranmoor (Diocese of Sheffield) from 1972 to 1974.

From 1974 to 1978, Carr was the chaplain of Chelmsford Cathedral (Diocese of Chelmsford). Until 1982 he was also deputy director of the Cathedral Centre for Research and Training. From 1978 to 1987 he was a canon residentiary of the cathedral. From 1976 to 1984 he was also Diocesan Director of Training. In 1987 Carr left Chelmsford to become Dean of Bristol.

In 1997, he moved to Westminster Abbey, where later that year he officiated at the funeral service of Diana, Princess of Wales. In 2002 he also officiated at the funeral of Queen Elizabeth The Queen Mother. In 1998, he was at the centre of a controversy over his abrupt dismissal of the abbey's Director of Music, Martin Neary, over accounting practices for professional concerts and recordings occurring outside the abbey. The matter was contested and referred to Lord Jauncey of Tullichettle for determination at the behest of Queen Elizabeth II. While Lord Jauncey's report upheld Neary's dismissal in finding him to be partially at fault, he was careful to note Neary's years of exceptional service and that his actions were not legally wrongful and did not amount to meaningful harm. The finding further criticised the dean and chapter for the manner in which Neary was dismissed, stating that the abbey, "must score gamma minus on the scale of natural justice" and concluding with the observation that, "had the parties been prepared to discuss openly and frankly the Abbey's concerns, to acknowledge that serious mistakes had been made and to consider the reasons therefor, it might perhaps have been possible to avoid the present unhappy situation with all its attendant publicity and to have reached a rather less dramatic resolution of their differences."

Carr was made an honorary DLitt of the University of the West of England in Bristol in 1997. On his retirement as Dean of Westminster in 2006 he was appointed a Knight Commander of the Royal Victorian Order (KCVO) on 17 February. As a priest he had the same precedence as a knight of the relevant order. Carr was the author of a number of books about aspects of the Christian faith.

References

1941 births
2017 deaths
Alumni of Jesus College, Oxford
Alumni of Jesus College, Cambridge
Alumni of the University of Sheffield
British monarchy
Church of England deans
Deans of Westminster
Deans of Bristol
People educated at Dulwich College
Knights Commander of the Royal Victorian Order